The General Command was the highest command body in the Royal Danish Army. It was erected in 1922 Defence Agreement, adopted by Rigsdagen on 7 August  1922 and was a result of collecting 1st and 2nd General Command. It was terminated in 1950, following the Danish defense reform of 1950, which split it into Eastern and Western Regional Command.

Role
The Chief of the General Command was responsible for the war preparations, but the execution was left to the General Staff, which until 1932 was an independent institution directly under the Ministry of War. The Chief of the General Staff, thus held an independent advisory position to the Ministry of War even though he was designated as the Chief of Staff to the Chief of the General Command. After the 1932 Defence Agreement, the General Staff was place under the General Command. This meant the Chief of the General Command had two subordinate staffs:
The General Command Staff: command over the troops, exercises and education
The General Staff: war preparation

Additionally, the Inspector Generals and the heads of the technical corps were also subjugated the Chief of the General Command.

Chiefs of the General command

References

Bibliography
 
 
 
 
 
 
 
 

Military of Denmark